Lorraine Lévy (born 29 January 1964) is a French screenwriter, film and stage director, and playwright. She is the sister of writer Marc Levy.

Life and career
After studying literature and law, Lévy became a screenwriter for Jean-Loup Dabadie and René Cleitman while also working as an editor for a publishing house that specializes in art. In 1985, she founded the stage company Compagnie de l'Entracte which staged her first play Finie la comédie (1987). Mostly a screenwriter, she has written screenplays for many telefilms and several episodes of the series Joséphine, ange gardien. In 2004, she made her feature film directorial debut with the comedy film The First Time I Turned Twenty.

Filmography

Theatre

References

External links

 

1964 births
Living people
French film directors
French women film directors
French women screenwriters
French screenwriters
French women dramatists and playwrights
French theatre directors
People from Boulogne-Billancourt